John Gallie (26 November 1899 – 9 December 1949) was a British sports shooter. He competed in the 50 m pistol event at the 1948 Summer Olympics.

References

1899 births
1949 deaths
British male sport shooters
Olympic shooters of Great Britain
Shooters at the 1948 Summer Olympics